Sailly-sur-la-Lys (literally Sailly on the Lys) is a commune in the Pas-de-Calais department in the Hauts-de-France region of France.

Geography
The river Lys forms much of the western and northern boundary of the commune.

Population

Places of interest

 The church of St. Vaast, rebuilt, along with most of the village, after the First World War.
 The Commonwealth War Graves Commission Canadian and Anzac cemeteries.
 The sixteenth century Prévôté; the oldest building in the town.  .
The prévôté is a fortified building located by the parish cemetery, near the Lys. It includes the remains of the prison and the courts of justice. A chapel dedicated to the Virgin complements the construction. The gateway, which was destroyed in the sixteenth century and rebuilt in 1612, is defended by two towers with mullioned windows. Before the French Revolution, it was the provost  that represented the abbot of Saint-Vaast in all matters civil and judicial.

Sailly-sur-la-Lys is twinned with Carnforth, England.

See also
Communes of the Pas-de-Calais department

References

External links

 Official commune website
 Official website of Sailly sur la Lys' social club
 The CWGC Canadian cemetery
 The CWGC graves in the churchyard

Saillysurlalys